Schreber is a German surname. Notable people with the surname include:

Daniel Paul Schreber (1842–1911), German judge
Johann Christian Daniel von Schreber (1739–1810), German naturalist
Moritz Schreber (1808–1861), German physician and inventor

German-language surnames